Tranarossan House is an early 20th century building in Carrigart, County Donegal, Ireland. It was designed by Edwin Lutyens for Lucy Phillimore, wife of Robert Charles Phillimore. The Phillimores had bought the land on the Donegal coast in the 1890s and commissioned Lutyens to build a holiday home. The house is little documented and is not recorded in most studies of Lutyens. After her husband's death, Lucy Phillimore handed the house over to An Óige, the Irish Youth Hostel Association, in 1937. It still operates as An Óige's most northerly hostel and is a protected structure.

History and architecture
Robert Charles Phillimore came from a family of successful and prosperous lawyers and politicians. He and his wife Lucy bought land at Carrigart in the 1890s and later commissioned Edwin Lutyens to design them a holiday home. By 1907, the year Tranarossan was completed, Lutyens had established himself as one of England's leading architects of country houses. In his study of English domestic buildings, Das englische Haus, published in 1904, Hermann Muthesius had written of him, "He is a young man who has come increasingly to the forefront of domestic architects and who may soon become the accepted leader among English builders of houses".

Robert Phillimore died in 1919. After retaining the house for nearly 20 years, his widow donated it to An Óige in 1937. The house remains a youth hostel, the most northerly in Ireland. The house is little documented and is not referenced in most of the major studies of Lutyens and his work.

In his North West Ulster volume of the Buildings of Ireland series, Alistair Rowan describes Tranarossan as “two gabled granite blocks…the roofs huge unbroken slopes of heavy local slate”. The building is of one main storey, with attic bedrooms in the gables. Rowan, noting a “typical Lutyens joke” - a pier rising from the veranda stops just short of the roof beam it purports to support - calls the house a “witty holiday home”. Tranarossan is listed by Donegal County Council on its Record of Protected Structures.

Notes

References

Sources
 
 
 
 

Buildings and structures in County Donegal
Works of Edwin Lutyens in Ireland
Arts and Crafts architecture